The ninth season of Modern Family premiered on September 27, 2017 on ABC. The season was produced by 20th Century Fox Television, Steven Levitan Productions, and Picador Productions, with creators Steven Levitan and Christopher Lloyd as showrunners. Modern Family was renewed for its ninth and tenth seasons in May 2017.

Cast

Main cast
 Ed O'Neill as Jay Pritchett 
 Sofía Vergara as Gloria Pritchett
 Julie Bowen as Claire Dunphy 
 Ty Burrell as Phil Dunphy 
 Jesse Tyler Ferguson as Mitchell Pritchett 
 Eric Stonestreet as Cameron Tucker 
 Sarah Hyland as Haley Dunphy 
 Ariel Winter as Alex Dunphy 
 Nolan Gould as Luke Dunphy 
 Rico Rodriguez as Manny Delgado
 Aubrey Anderson-Emmons as Lily Tucker-Pritchett
 Jeremy Maguire as Joe Pritchett

Recurring cast
 Dana Powell as Pam Tucker
 Marsha Kramer as Margaret
 Chris Geere as Arvin Fennerman
 Mira Sorvino as Nicole Rosemary Page
 Christian Barillas as Ronaldo

Guest cast

 Joe Mande as Ben
 Vanessa Williams as Rhonda
 Rob Riggle as Gil Thorpe
 Nathan Lane as Pepper Saltzman
 Chazz Palminteri as Vincent "Shorty"
 Shelley Long as DeDe Pritchett
 Chris Martin as himself
 Terry Bradshaw as himself
 Billy Crystal as himself
 James Van Der Beek as Bo Johnson
 Fred Willard as Frank Dunphy
 Fred Savage as Caleb
 Cheyenne Jackson as Max
 Sarah Baker as Shirl Chambers
 Kevin Daniels as Longinus
 Colin Hanlon as Steven
 George Brett as himself
 Gabriel Iglesias as Jorge
 Alyssa de Boisblanc as Christina
 Jim Piddick as Malcolm Fennerman
 Kate Burton as Iris Fennerman
 Reid Ewing as Dylan Marshall
 Nathan Fillion as Rainer Shine
 Adam DeVine as Andy Bailey
 Mary Louise Wilson as Aunt Becky
 Jane Krakowski as Dr. Donna Duncan
 Harry Groener as Joel L.L. Logan
 Ben Schwartz as Nick
 Leslie Mann as Katie
 Toks Olagundoye as Lucy

Episodes

Ratings

References

External links
 

2017 American television seasons
2018 American television seasons
9